was the Minister of Agriculture, Forestry and Fisheries in the Japanese Cabinet of Junichiro Koizumi.

Born in Ikuno-ku, Osaka, Kitagawa graduated from Faculty of Law, Soka University and became a lawyer. In 1990, he was elected to the House of Representatives for the first time and since 2004 has been Minister of Land, Infrastructure and Transport. Member of New Komeito.

He was the general secretary of New Komeito when the party suffered a major defeat in the 2009 Japanese general election. New Komeito lost ten seats, including Kitagawa's and that of party leader Akihiro Ota. On 8 September 2009 Yoshihisa Inoue replaced Kitagawa as general secretary of New Komeito. Notwithstanding the loss of his seat, Kitagawa became deputy president of the party.

Kitagawa regained his seat representing the Osaka 16th district (representing Sakai-ku, Higashi-ku and Kita-ku in Sakai City) in the 2012 general election, and held the seat in the 2014 general election.

References

External links 
  Official website
Profile

1953 births
Living people
People from Osaka
20th-century Japanese lawyers
Members of the House of Representatives (Japan)
Ministers of Land, Infrastructure, Transport and Tourism of Japan
21st-century Japanese politicians
New Komeito politicians